Radwan Ghazi Moumneh  is a Canadian recording engineer, producer, and musician.

Moumneh's family fled the Lebanese Civil War for the Sultanate of Oman, where he grew up, moving to Montreal in 1993. Throughout the mid 1990s and early 2000s Moumneh recorded, and toured with, a number of Montreal-based hardcore and punk bands such as The Black Hand and IRE. In 2004 Moumneh established the Hotel2Tango recording studio with Howard Bilerman, Efrim Menuck, and Thierry Amar (the later two are core members of Godspeed You! Black Emperor and Thee Silver Mt. Zion Memorial Orchestra). In 2005 Moumneh began performing live as Jerusalem in My Heart with a number of collaborators, a project with whom he has released two full-length records. Jerusalem In My Heart also released a collaborative album with Suuns - Suuns and Jerusalem in My Heart- (whom Moumneh had previously recorded). As a recording engineer and producer Moumneh has worked with an assortment of acts including Suuns, Mashrou' Leila, ...And the Saga Continues, Matana Roberts, and Ought (band).

Discography

Jerusalem in My Heart
Qalaq LP/CD/BOXSET (2021, Constellation Records (Canada))
Daqa'iq Tudaiq LP/CD (2018, Constellation Records (Canada))
If He Dies, If If If If If If  LP/CD (2015, Constellation Records (Canada)) 
Suuns and Jerusalem in My Heart LP/CD (2015, Secretly Canadian)
Mo7it Al-Mo7it LP/CD (2013, Constellation Records (Canada))

Radwan Ghazi Moumneh & Eric Chenaux 
The Sentimental Moves LP (2012, Grapefruit (music label))

Land of Kush
Monogamy LP (2010, Constellation Records (Canada)) 
Against The Day LP/CD (2009, Constellation Records (Canada))

Pas Chic Chic 
Au Contraire (album) LP (2008, Semprini Records)

Cursed (band) 
II (Cursed album) LP/CD (2005, Goodfellow Records)
II (Cursed album) LP/CD (2003, Deathwish Inc.)

The Black Hand 
War Monger (album) LP/CD (2002, Scorched Earth Policy Records)
Pulling Your Strings (album) LP/CD (2001, Scorched Earth Policy Records)

IRE 
What Seed, What Root (album) LP/CD (1999, CrimethInc.)
I Discern an Overtone of Tragedy in Your Voice (album) LP/CD (1998, The Mountain Collective For Independent Artists, Ltd.)
Adversity Into Triumph (album) LP/CD (1996, Ellington Records (music label))

References 

Living people
Canadian record producers
Anglophone Quebec people
Musicians from Montreal
Year of birth missing (living people)
Canadian film score composers